Lavini is a surname, and can refer to:

Members of the Lavini family of Italy, including:
Giuseppe Lavini  (1721-1793), Italian literature scholar 
Giuseppe Lavini senior (1776-1847), professor of chemistry and pharmacy at the University of Turin, son of Carlo Amedeo
Amedeo Giuseppe Teresio Lavini (1820-1884), Italian magistrate, son of Giuseppe senior
Giuseppe Lavini (1857–1928), Italian painter and art critic, son of Amedeo Giuseppe Teresio
Amedeo Lavini (1894–1961), Italian Architect, only  son of Giuseppe
Celestina Lavini (1896–1977), 1st daughter of Giuseppe
Adelina Lavini (1901–1990), 2nd daughter of Giuseppe, in 1921 married Riccardo Ajmone-Marsan

Italian-language surnames
Compound surnames